Shelf Lake is an alpine lake in Custer County, Idaho, United States, located in the White Cloud Mountains in the Sawtooth National Recreation Area. The lake is named for a distinct rock shelf extending around the south and west shores of the lake.

The lake is accessed from Sawtooth National Forest trail 683. Shelf Lake is northeast of Merriam Peak and located in the lower section of the Boulder Chain Lakes Basin.

References

See also
List of lakes of the White Cloud Mountains
Hatchet Lake (Idaho)
Sawtooth National Recreation Area
White Cloud Mountains

Lakes of Idaho
Lakes of Custer County, Idaho
Glacial lakes of the United States
Glacial lakes of the Sawtooth National Forest